Xiamen Metro, officially branded as AMTR (Amoy Transit Rail, formerly Across Mass Transit Railway), is a rapid transit system serving Xiamen, Fujian, China. Line 1 began operation on 31 December 2017. Line 2 began operation on 25 December 2019. Line 3 began operation on 25 June 2021.

Background
Planning for a metro system began in the early 2000s in the meantime the mostly elevated Xiamen BRT opened in 2008. The initial phase of construction of the metro system was compiled as the Xiamen Urban Rail Transit Construction Plan (2011–2020) on 24 December 2010 and was approved by the National Development and Reform Commission on 11 May 2012. The construction started on 13 November 2013. Xiamen Urban Rail Transit Group was founded for the purpose of construction and operation. On 8 October 2016, the National Development and Reform Commission approved phase II of the Xiamen Urban Rail Transit Construction Plan (2016–2022).

The approved phase I of system development includes three lines (1, 2, 3) with 62 stations,  in length. The construction cost is projected to be 50.37 billion yuan.

The approved phase II of system development includes four lines (2 Phase II, 3 Phase II, 4, 6) with 67 stations,  in length. The construction cost is projected to be 100.092 billion yuan.

The approved phase II of system adjustment includes Lines 3 Phase III, which will be extended further south by 4 stations,  in length. The construction cost is projected to be 5.769 billion yuan.

Network

Line 1 

Line 1, with 24 stations,  length, 50 min duration of trip and 20.39 billion yuan cost of construction, was opened on 31 December 2017. The line goes from south to north. The depot is situated at the northern end and is Xiamen Metro's principal depot. The line goes through Xiamen North railway station and connects the island (with 9 stations) and mainland (with 14 stations) parts of the city through a dam (with 1 station). Route: Lundu Ferry Terminal, Old Town, Jimei New Town, Xiamen North Railway Station. Line 1's color is orange. Line 1 uses six car CRRC Tangshan rolling stock.

Line 2 

It was opened on 25 December 2019. It runs from east to west through Xiamen Island and then through Haicang channel to the mainland.

Line 3 

It serves the Xiamen Island from southwest to northeast then cross to the mainland and head towards Xiamen's new Xiang'an Airport.

Under Construction

Line 4 
Line 4 will be  in length with 18 stations and is scheduled to be complete by 2020. Unlike other lines, which are radial lines that connect Xiamen island to the mainland, this line is a tangential express line running strictly on the mainland around Xiamen Island. It will connect Xiamen's new Xiang'an Airport to Xiamen North railway station.

Line 6 
Line 6 will be  in length with 27 stations and is scheduled to be complete by 2022. Like Line 4, it is a tangential line running strictly on the mainland north of Xiamen Island.

Line 9 
The total length of Line 9 is 44.2 kilometers, and runs completely underground. There are 24 stations, including 10 transfer stations, with an average station spacing of 1.91 kilometers.

Future plans
Xiamen city government plans to build an urban-suburban metro network comprising twelve lines,  in length, with 188 stations. Lines 3 and Line 6 will be extended further south by 4 stations,  length and further north by 7 stations,  length. Line 10 with 31 stations and  length will be reconstructed mainly from the BRT line. Line 5 will have 27 stations and  length. Line 5 counts 29 stations and  length. Like Line 1, Line 4 and Line 10 will intersect at the new main Xiamen North railway station in Jimei District. In addition, there are plans to connect the Xiamen Metro with neighboring cities of Zhangzhou and Quanzhou using a new express subway Line R1. The plans were approved in 2015 by the NDRC

Network Map

See also

References

External links

 Official website 
 Official website 
 News about Xiamen Metro construction.
 ,  Maps of first line.
 
 ,  Maps of approved phase with 3 lines.
  Map of total planned system.

 厦门轨道交通建设预计2011年启动 BRT或升级 
 厦重启"将BRT升级为轻轨"计划 方案将报国家发改委 
 《厦门低碳交通规划》出炉 

 
Rail transport in Xiamen
Rapid transit in China
Transport in Xiamen
Railway lines opened in 2017
2017 establishments in China